Ribamontán al Monte is a municipality located in the autonomous community of Cantabria, Spain.
 Rutas de Senderismo y Mountain bike por Ribamontán al Monte

Municipalities in Cantabria